is the 27th major single by the Japanese idol girl group AKB48. The members were chosen from their placements in the AKB48's 2012 general election. The single was released in Japan on August 29, 2012. It includes the graduation song for long-time headlining member Atsuko Maeda.

2012 general election 
On March 26, 2012, AKB48 announced it would be holding an election to determine the lineup for its 27th major single. The field of candidates consisted of 243 members from AKB48, SKE48, NMB48, and HKT48, and the ballots were available in the group's 26th single, "Manatsu no Sounds Good!" The election results were announced on June 6 at Nippon Budokan and results were broadcast live on TV for the first time. Yuko Oshima came first, followed by Mayu Watanabe and Yuki Kashiwagi.

This is the first single without Atsuko Maeda in the main lineup (excluding rock-paper-scissors singles) as she did not participate as a candidate in the election, and graduated from the group two days before the single's release. This is the second time Yuko Oshima became AKB48's center since "Heavy Rotation". This is also the last senbatsu participation for long-time AKB48 member Tomomi Kasai.

Promotion and release 

The single was released in three versions: Type A, Type B and Theater Edition.

Music video 
The video is directed by Joseph Kahn. and features actors Hideo Ishiguro (Kamen Rider Den-O), Kouhei Takeda (Hana Kimi, Kamen Rider Kiva), Dori Sakurada (Kamen Rider New Den-O) and Akira Nakao.  Yuko Oshima and Mayu Watanabe appeared in the video in two teams of black (Oshima's) and red (Watanabe's).  Atsuko Maeda also makes an appearance in the video.

The video consists of three story-lines that parody films: terrorists invade a police department, a schoolgirl explores a haunted hospital and a Golza from Ultraman Tiga attacks a city. It features a battle between the Motorgirls and the Car Devils.

Track listing

Type A

Type B

Theater Edition

Personnel

"Gingham Check" 
The lineup for the title track consists of the top 16 members from AKB48's 2012 general election.

Center: Yūko Ōshima
 Team A: Haruna Kojima, Mariko Shinoda, Minami Takahashi
 Team K: Tomomi Itano, Ayaka Umeda, Yūko Ōshima, Minami Minegishi, Sae Miyazawa, Yui Yokoyama
 Team B: Tomomi Kasai, Yuki Kashiwagi, Rie Kitahara, Mayu Watanabe
 SKE48 Team S / AKB48 Team K: Jurina Matsui
 SKE48 Team S: Rena Matsui
 HKT48 Team H: Rino Sashihara

"Yume no Kawa" 
Atsuko Maeda's graduation song. Maeda had graduated two days prior to the single's release.
 Team A: Haruna Kojima, Mariko Shinoda, Minami Takahashi, Atsuko Maeda
 Team K: Tomomi Itano, Yūko Ōshima, Minami Minegishi
 Team B: Yuki Kashiwagi, Mayu Watanabe
 SKE48 Team S / AKB48 Team K: Jurina Matsui

"Nante Bohemian" 
Performed by Under Girls, which consist of members who ranked 17 to 32 in AKB48's 2012 general election.

Center: Aki Takajō
 Team A: Asuka Kuramochi, Aki Takajō
 Team K: Sayaka Akimoto
 Team B: Amina Satō, Yuka Masuda
 Team 4: Haruka Shimazaki
 SKE48 Team S: Masana Oya, Yuria Kizaki, Akari Suda, Kumi Yagami
 SKE48 Team KII: Shiori Ogiso, Akane Takayanagi, Sawako Hata, Airi Furukawa
 NMB48 Team N / AKB48 Team B: Miyuki Watanabe
 NMB48 Team N: Sayaka Yamamoto

"Doremifa Onchi" 
Performed by Next Girls, which consist of members who ranked 33 to 48 in AKB48's 2012 general election.

Center: Misaki Iwasa
 Team A: Misaki Iwasa, Haruka Katayama, Haruka Nakagawa, Chisato Nakata, Sayaka Nakaya, Ami Maeda
 Team K: Reina Fujie
 Team B: Kana Kobayashi, Miho Miyazaki
 Team 4: Yuka Tano, Mariya Nagao
 SKE48 Team KII: Manatsu Mukaida
 SKE48 Kenkyūsei: Matsumura Kaori
 NMB48 Team N: Aina Fukumoto, Nana Yamada
 HKT48 Team H: Sakura Miyawaki

"Show fight!" 
Performed by Future Girls, which consist of members who ranked 49 to 64 in AKB48's 2012 general election.

Center: Tomu Muto
 Team A: Aika Ōta, Shizuka Ōya
 Team K: Ayaka Kikuchi, Moeno Nito, Sakiko Matsui
 Team B: Haruka Ishida, Mika Komori, Sumire Satō
 Team 4: Miori Ichikawa, Mina Ōba, Suzuran Yamauchi
 Team Kenkyūsei: Tomu Muto
 SKE48 Team S: Yuka Nakanishi
 SKE48 Team KII: Miki Yakata
 SKE48 Team E: Kanon Kimoto
 NMB48 Team N: Mayu Ogasawara

"Ano Hi no Fūrin" 
Performed by Waiting Girls, which consist of members who participated as a candidate for AKB48's 2012 general election, but did not place in the top 64. There were a total of 171 members in this group.
 Team A: Natsumi Matsubara
 Team K: Mayumi Uchida, Miku Tanabe, Tomomi Nakatsuka, Misato Nonaka
 Team B: Natsuki Satō, Shihori Suzuki, Mariya Suzuki, Rina Chikano
 Team 4: Maria Abe, Anna Iriyama, Karen Iwata, Rena Kato, Rina Kawaei, Haruka Shimada, Juri Takahashi, Miyu Takeuchi, Shiori Nakamata, Mariko Nakamura
 Undecided Team: Rina Izuta, Natsuki Kojima, Marina Kobayashi, Wakana Natori, Nana Fujita, Ayaka Morikawa
 Kenkyūsei: Moe Aigasa, Maika Amemiya, Saho Iwatate, Ayano Umeta, Ryoka Oshima, Ayaka Okada, Shiori Kita, Saki Kitazawa, Erena Saeed-Yokota, Yukari Sasaki, Ayana Shinozaki, Yurina Takashima, Haruna Hasegawa, Rina Hirata, Kaoru Mitsumune, Yuiri Murayama, Shinobu Mogi, Sakura Moriyama, Nene Watanabe
 SKE48 Team S: Rumi Kato, Yukiko Kinoshita, Mizuki Kuwabara, Shiori Takada, Aki Deguchi, Kanako Hiramatsu
 SKE48 Team KII: Riirina Akeda, Riho Abiru, Anna Ishida, Tomoko Kato, Risako Goto, Seira Sato, Mieko Sato, Rina Matsumoto, Rieka Yamada
 SKE48 Team E: Kyoka Isohara, Kasumi Ueno, Madoka Umemoto, Shiori Kaneko, Ami Kobayashi, Mei Sakai, Aya Shibata, Yumana Takagi, Mai Takeuchi, Rika Tsuzuki, Minami Hara, Yukari Yamashita
 SKE48 Kenkyūsei: Shiori Iguchi, Narumi Ichino, Asana Inuzuka, Tsugumi Iwanaga, Mikoto Uchiyama, Yuna Ego, Arisa Ōwaki, Risa Ogino, Momona Kitō, Emiri Kobayashi, Makiko Saito, Nanako Suga, Sayaka Niidoi, Miki Hioki, Mizuki Fujimoto, Haruka Futamura, Nao Furuhata, Honoka Mizuno, Ami Miyamae, Mizuho Yamada
 NMB48 Team N: Kanako Kadowaki, Rika Kishino, Haruna Kinoshita, Riho Kotani, Rina Kondō, Kanna Shinohara, Kei Jōnishi, Miru Shiroma, Shiori Matsuda, Yūki Yamaguchi, Akari Yoshida
 NMB48 Team M: Riona Ōta, Ayaka Okita, Rena Kawakami, Momoka Kinoshita, Rena Shimada, Eriko Jo, Yui Takano, Airi Tanigawa, Ayame Hikawa, Runa Fujita, Mao Mita, Ayaka Murakami, Sae Murase, Fūko Yagura, Natsumi Yamagishi, Keira Yogi
 NMB48 Kenkyūsei: Hono Akazawa, Hono Akazawa, Yuki Azuma, Anri Ishizuka, Yūmi Ishida, Anna Ijiri, Mirei Ueda, Mizuki Uno, Mako Umehara, Yūri Ōta, Yūka Kato, Emika Kamieda, Konomi Kusaka, Rina Kushiro, Hazuki Kurokawa, Saki Kōno, Narumi Koga, Rikako Kobayashi, Arisa Koyanagi, Sorai Satō, Nanami Sasaki, Riko Takayama, Sora Tōgō, Hiromi Nakagawa, Rurina Nishizawa, Momoka Hayashi, Riko Hisada, Arisa Miura, Kanako Muro, Shu Yabushita, Tsubasa Yamauchi, Hitomi Yamamoto
 HKT48 Team H: Chihiro Anai, Nao Ueki, Serina Kumazawa, Haruka Kodama, Yui Komori, Yuki Shimono, Yūko Sugamoto, Natsumi Tanaka, Airi Taniguchi, Chiyori Nakanishi, Natsumi Matsuoka, Anna Murashige, Aoi Motomura, Madoka Moriyasu, Haruka Wakatabe
 HKT48 Kenkyūsei: Kyōka Abe, Mina Imada, Sayaka Etō, Ayaka Nakanishi, Maiko Fukagawa

Charts

Oricon (Japan)

G-music (Taiwan)

Release history

JKT48 Version

"" is the sixth released single from the Indonesian idol girl group JKT48.

Promotion and release
JKT48 held their first Members Election to select members that would participate for this single. The single was released in a dedicated concert on 11 June 2014.

Track listing 
The single has two editions: the regular version (CD+DVD) and theater version (CD only) (one distributed in ALFA MIDI · LAWSON and one from JKT48 theater).

Regular version

Bonus
 Member photo
 Member's autographed card message (First 10,000 buyers)

Theater version

Bonus
ALFA MIDI · LAWSON
Call card
Trump card

JKT48 Theater
Trump card
Handshake ticket

Notes

References
Releases

Other references

External links

2012 singles
AKB48 songs
Billboard Japan Hot 100 number-one singles
Music videos directed by Joseph Kahn
Oricon Weekly number-one singles
Songs with lyrics by Yasushi Akimoto
King Records (Japan) singles
2012 songs
MNL48 songs

pt:Gingham Check